This is a list of number-one songs in 1981 on the Italian charts compiled weekly by the Italian Hit Parade Singles Chart.

Chart history

Number-one artists

References

1981
1981 in Italian music
1981 record charts